Lestremiinae is a subfamily of Cecidomyiidae. It is composed of 105 described species classified into 13 genera. The larvae feed on fungi, primarily in rotting wood.

Genera
Allarete Pritchard, 1951
Allaretella Meyer & Spungis, 1994
Anarete Halliday, 1833
Anaretella Enderlein, 1911
Buschingomyia Jaschhof & Jaschhof, 2011
Conarete Pritchard, 1951
Eomastix Jaschhof, 2009
Gongromastix Enderlein, 1936
Insulestremia Jaschhof, 2004
Lestremia Macquart, 1826
Mangogrostix Mamaev, 1985
Neolestremia Mani, 1934
Wasmanniella Kieffer, 1898

References

Cecidomyiidae
Nematocera subfamilies